The 2019 Denmark Open (officially known as the Danisa Denmark Open presented by Victor 2019 for sponsorship reasons) was a badminton competition which took place at Odense Sports Park in Odense, Denmark, from 15 to 20 October 2019. It had a total purse of $775,000.

Tournament
The 2019 Denmark Open was the twentieth tournament of the 2019 BWF World Tour and also part of the Denmark Open championships, which has been held since 1935. This tournament was organized by Badminton Denmark with the sanction of the BWF.

Venue
This international tournament was held at Odense Sports Park in Odense, Denmark.

Point distribution
Below is the point distribution table for each phase of the tournament based on the BWF points system for the BWF World Tour Super 750 event.

Prize money
The total prize money for this tournament was US$775,000. Distribution of prize money was in accordance with BWF regulations.

Men's singles

Seeds

 Kento Momota (champion)
 Chou Tien-chen (quarter-finals) 
 Shi Yuqi (withdrew)
 Anders Antonsen (quarter-finals)
 Chen Long (final)
 Jonatan Christie (second round)
 Viktor Axelsen (semi-finals)
 Anthony Sinisuka Ginting (first round)

Finals

Top half

Section 1

Section 2

Bottom half

Section 3

Section 4

Women's singles

Seeds

 Akane Yamaguchi (first round)
 Chen Yufei (semi-finals)
 Nozomi Okuhara (final)
 Tai Tzu-ying (champion)
 P. V. Sindhu (second round) 
 Ratchanok Intanon (second round) 
 He Bingjiao (first round)
 Saina Nehwal (first round)

Finals

Top half

Section 1

Section 2

Bottom half

Section 3

Section 4

Men's doubles

Seeds

 Marcus Fernaldi Gideon / Kevin Sanjaya Sukamuljo (champions)
 Mohammad Ahsan / Hendra Setiawan (final)
 Li Junhui / Liu Yuchen (quarter-finals)
 Takeshi Kamura / Keigo Sonoda (semi-finals)
 Hiroyuki Endo / Yuta Watanabe (quarter-finals)
 Han Chengkai / Zhou Haodong (quarter-finals)
 Fajar Alfian / Muhammad Rian Ardianto (quarter-finals)
 Kim Astrup / Anders Skaarup Rasmussen (first round)

Finals

Top half

Section 1

Section 2

Bottom half

Section 3

Section 4

Women's doubles

Seeds

 Mayu Matsumoto / Wakana Nagahara (semi-finals)
 Yuki Fukushima / Sayaka Hirota (semi-finals)
 Misaki Matsutomo / Ayaka Takahashi (first round)
 Chen Qingchen / Jia Yifan (final)
 Greysia Polii / Apriyani Rahayu (second round)
 Lee So-hee / Shin Seung-chan (quarter-finals)
 Du Yue / Li Yinhui (second round)
 Kim So-yeong / Kong Hee-yong (quarter-finals)

Finals

Top half

Section 1

Section 2

Bottom half

Section 3

Section 4

Mixed doubles

Seeds

 Zheng Siwei / Huang Yaqiong (quarter-finals)
 Wang Yilü / Huang Dongping (final)
 Yuta Watanabe / Arisa Higashino (first round)
 Chan Peng Soon / Goh Liu Ying (quarter-finals)
 Seo Seung-jae / Chae Yoo-jung (semi-finals)
 Praveen Jordan / Melati Daeva Oktavianti (champions)
 Marcus Ellis / Lauren Smith (first round)
 Tang Chun Man / Tse Ying Suet (quarter-finals)

Finals

Top half

Section 1

Section 2

Bottom half

Section 3

Section 4

References

External links
 Official Website
 Tournament Link

Denmark Open
Denmark Open
Denmark Open
Denmark Open